NASCAR Scene (originally Grand National Scene and later Winston Cup Scene) was a weekly magazine about NASCAR stock car racing.  It was established in North Carolina in 1976 and lasted until January 2010, making it one of the oldest NASCAR-specific publications at the time of this final issue.  NASCAR Scene had a sister publication, NASCAR Illustrated, a monthly NASCAR lifestyle magazine format, that was published until August 2016.

Robert Griggs, founder of the magazine, sold it to American City Business Journals in 1992, where it became part of Street & Smith's sports division.

NASCAR Scene announced it would cease its weekly publication on January 6, 2010.  The last issue was published in December 2009. Much of the content in Scene was merged into NASCAR Illustrated which was enhanced with additional coverage Nationwide Series and Camping World Truck Series.

All rights belong American City Business Journals.  A special Grand National Scene was part of the 2019 NASCAR throwback weekend at Darlington Raceway  in Darlington, South Carolina]].  The plan for the magazine will be original commentary from Houston, Waid, Deb Williams, Jeff Owens, and Kenny Bruce, and actual archived Scene results from the publication as part of celebrating the annual Throwback Weekend.

NASCAR Scene staff

Phil Cavali
Virginia Tech basketball
David Exum
Jeff Gluck (Now writes for The Athletic)
David Griffin
Mike Hembree (Now writes for USA Today)
Lee Montgomery
Bob Pockrass (Now writes for Fox Sports)
Jared Turner (Now writes for NASCAR Pole Position Magazine and track souvenir programs)
Steve Waid (Now writes for PopularSpeed.com)
Ben White
Rea White
Sam Cranston
Shea Alexander
Suzanne Corrado
Scott Greig
Jeff Owens (Now writes for Sporting News)
Mark Sluder
Art Weinstein
Tom Stinson (Now edits for SportsBusiness Journal)
Deb Williams
Rick Houston (now host of The Scene Vault Podcast with Steve Waid)
Chad Fletcher
Jim Fluharty
Tim Wilcox
Gene Granger 
Gary McCredie
Joe Whitlock

References

External links
Official site 
Scene Vault

Advance Publications
Defunct magazines published in the United States
Magazines established in 1976
Magazines disestablished in 2010
Magazines published in North Carolina
Mass media in Charlotte, North Carolina
NASCAR magazines
Sports magazines published in the United States
Weekly magazines published in the United States